Jiří Nigrin (Černý) z Černého Mostu, since about 1590 titled z Nigropontu (died 1606) was an important printer in Prague between 1572 and 1606. Among other works, Nigrin published many of the compositions of renaissance composer Jacobus Gallus.

Literature 
 Kašparová, Jaroslava: Španělské tisky 16. století z dílny pražského tiskaře Jiřího Nigrina

External links
 https://web.archive.org/web/20061009202642/http://www.pribramska.cz/knih/semprace/utrhacu.html

1606 deaths
Businesspeople from Prague
16th-century printers
17th-century printers
Year of birth unknown
Date of death unknown
17th-century Bohemian people